Gadani is a coastal town of Hub District located in the southern part of Balochistan along the Arabian Sea, Pakistan.  and is just a 1-hour drive away from Karachi. The population of Gadani was estimated to be around 10,000 in 2005. More than 97% of the population is Muslim with a small Hindu minority. The majority of the population speaks Balochi, Brahui languages and there is a small Lasi speaking minority. They belong to the Sanghur, Kurd, Sajdi, Muhammad Hasni, Gurginari and Bezinjo tribes.

Many prehistoric shell-midden sites were discovered along the shores of a small bay, near Gadani. They are characterized of heaps of fragments of marine and mangrove shells among which are flint and jasper tools and stone querns. The first radiocarbon dates obtained from these middens indicate they result from the activity of people who settled along the coast both during the seventh and the fifth millennium before present.

Gadani Power Project
Gadani Power Project (also known as Pakistan Power Park) was a proposed energy complex in Gadani, Balochistan, Pakistan under the China-Pakistan Economic Corridor. In August 2013, Pakistani Government announced  to establish ten coal power plants of total capacity of 6,600 MW with technical and financial assistance mostly from China. China is providing with debt to cover 85% of the project cost, while the rest of the finances would be arranged by the government of Pakistan. The total cost of the project is PKR 144.6 billion.

10×660 MW coal based power plants at Gadani Energy Park will be constructed, while Chinese have agreed to invest in 6 projects, two projects will be constructed by ANC Dubai and one project has been initiated by Government of Pakistan. The Ciner Group of Turkey has agreed to immediately start work on a 660 MW coal power plant at Gadani.

Gadani Ship Breaking Yard

The yard consists of 132 ship-breaking plots.

In 1980s, Gadani was the largest ship-breaking yard in the world, with more than 30,000 direct employees. However, competition from newer facilities in Alang, India and Chittagong, Bangladesh resulted in a significant reduction in output, with Gadani, today, producing less than one fifth of the scrap it produced in the 1980s. The recent reduction in taxes on scrap metal has led to a modest resurgence of output at Gadani, which now employs around 6,000 workers.

Over one million tons of steel is salvaged per year, and much of it is sold domestically. In the 2009-2010 fiscal year, a record 107 ships, with a combined light displacement tonnage (LDT) of 852,022 tons, were broken at Gadani whereas in the previous 2008-2009 fiscal year, 86 ships, with a combined LDT of 778,598 tons, were turned into scrap.

It currently has an annual capacity of breaking up to 125 ships of all sizes, including supertankers, with a combined LDT of 1,000,000 tons.

See also 
 Gadani Beach
 Gadani Fish Harbour
 Gadani ship-breaking yard
 Gadani Industrial Estate

References

External links
 Hub District Government

Archaeological sites in Balochistan, Pakistan
Populated coastal places in Pakistan
Populated places in Hub District
Port cities and towns in Pakistan
Indian Ocean
Arabian Sea